Lanthanum acetate is an inorganic compound, a salt of lanthanum with acetic acid with the chemical formula .

Synthesis
Reaction of lanthanum(III) oxide and acetic anhydride:

La2O3 + 3(CH3CO)2O -> 2La(CH3COO)3

Also reaction of lanthanum oxide with 50% acetic acid:

La2O3 + 6CH3COOH -> 2La(CH3COO)3 + 3H2O

Physical properties
Lanthanum(III) acetate forms colorless crystals.

Dissolves in water.

Forms crystallohydrates of the composition •n, where n = 1 and 1.5.

Uses
The compound is used in specialty glass manufacturing and in water treatment.

Also, it is used to produce porous lanthanum oxyfluoride (LaOF) films.

References

Inorganic compounds
Acetates
Lanthanum compounds